Amelia M. Haviland is an American statistician currently the Anna Loomis McCandless Professor of Statistics and Public Policy at Carnegie Mellon University. She was named a Fellow of the American Statistical Association in 2021.

References

External links

Year of birth missing (living people)
Living people
Carnegie Mellon University faculty
American statisticians
Women statisticians
Carnegie Mellon University alumni
Fellows of the American Statistical Association